Bülent Ulusoy (born January 7, 1978 in Trabzon) is a Turkish boxer best known to win the European title 2000 at welterweight.

Career
In 2000, Bulent Ulusoy won the Euro welterweight title. At the Olympics 2000 he lost the quarterfinal to Vitalie Gruşac. In 2001 he competed at the world championships at junior middleweight and beat Jean Pascal and lost to Marian Simion 19:20.

Ulusoy qualified for the 2004 Summer Olympics by ending up in first place at the 4th AIBA European 2004 Olympic Qualifying Tournament in Baku, Azerbaijan. At the Olympics 2004 he lost in the men's welterweight division to Sherzod Husanov.

He won the 2005 Mediterranean Games. At the European Championships 2006 he lost his first match against Russian favorite Andrey Balanov.

References

External links
Euro 2000

1978 births
Living people
Boxers at the 2000 Summer Olympics
Boxers at the 2004 Summer Olympics
Olympic boxers of Turkey
Welterweight boxers
Light-middleweight boxers
Turkish male boxers
European champions for Turkey
AIBA World Boxing Championships medalists
Mediterranean Games gold medalists for Turkey
Competitors at the 2001 Mediterranean Games
Competitors at the 2005 Mediterranean Games
Mediterranean Games medalists in boxing